The Radio Télévision Suisse (RTS) is a Swiss public broadcasting organisation. Part of SRG SSR, RTS handles production and broadcasting of radio and television programming in French for Switzerland. It was created on 1 January 2010 by a merger of Radio suisse romande and Télévision suisse romande.

History 
The first evening programme to be broadcast in colour on Télévision suisse romande was broadcast in 1968.

The station has been accused of multiple cases of sexual harassment in recent years, including news personality Darius Rochebin.

Future 

While keeping its headquarters in Geneva, Radio Télévision Suisse moved its Lausanne-based radio headquarters to a new building on the Lausanne campus in 2020.

Broadcasting

Radio
Radio Suisse Romande (RSR) is the area of RTS in charge of production and broadcasting of radio programming in French for Switzerland:
 La 1ère — general programming
 Espace 2 — cultural and intellectual programming; classical and jazz music
 Couleur 3 — youth programming
 Option Musique — music and variety programming

Television
Télévision Suisse Romande (TSR) is the area of RTS in charge of production and distribution of television programming in French for Switzerland:
 RTS 1
 RTS 2
 RTS Info

See also 
 Public Francophone Radios

References

External links

  

2010 establishments in Switzerland
French-language mass media in Switzerland
Radio in Switzerland
Television channels and stations established in 2010
Television in Switzerland
Swiss Broadcasting Corporation